Dolecta juturna is a moth in the family Cossidae. It is found in Brazil.
http://animaldiversity.org/accounts/Dolecta_juturna/classification/

Cossidae